Federal elections were held in Switzerland on 28 October 1917. The Free Democratic Party retained its majority in the National Council. They were the last elections held under the majoritarian system; following a referendum in 1918 in which two-thirds of voters voted for the introduction of proportional representation, the electoral system was changed and early elections held in 1919.

Electoral system
The 189 members of the National Council were elected in 49 single- and multi-member constituencies using a three-round system. Candidates had to receive a majority in the first or second round to be elected; if it went to a third round, only a plurality was required. Voters could cast as many votes as there were seats in their constituency. There was one seat for every 20,000 citizens, with seats allocated to cantons in proportion to their population.

Results
Voter turnout was highest in Schaffhausen (where voting was compulsory) at 86.8% and lowest in Uri at 23.4%.

By constituency

References

1917
Switzerland
1917 in Switzerland
October 1917 events
Federal